Charles Capper (1944 – July 1, 2021) was an American historian known for his work on Transcendentalism and his biographies of Margaret Fuller.

Life
Capper graduated from Johns Hopkins University and UC Berkeley with an M.A. and Ph.D. in history. From 1986 until 2001, he was a professor of history at the University of North Carolina at Chapel Hill. Since 2001 he has been Professor of History at Boston University. In 1993, his first book, Margaret Fuller: An American Romantic Life, won the Bancroft Prize. Seven editions of his volume The American Intellectual Tradition, co-edited with David Hollinger, have been published. In 2002, Capper co-founded the journal Modern Intellectual History with Nicholas Phillipson and Anthony J. La Vopa. He died in Minneapolis, Minnesota, on July 1, 2021, from complications of Parkinson's disease.

Awards
 1993 Bancroft Prize
 1994 Guggenheim Fellowship
 National Endowment for the Humanities Fellowship
 National Humanities Center Fellowship
 Charles Warren Center Fellowship

Works
 
 
 
 
 Anthony J. La Vopa, Nicholas Phillipson, Charles Capper, eds. Modern Intellectual History.

References

External links
"Winner of the 1993 Bancroft Prize ", Oxford University Press

1944 births
2021 deaths
21st-century American historians
21st-century American male writers
Johns Hopkins University alumni
UC Berkeley College of Letters and Science alumni
University of North Carolina at Chapel Hill faculty
Boston University faculty
Bancroft Prize winners
American male non-fiction writers